The following is a timeline of the history of the city of Nantes, France.

Prior to 19th century

 374 CE - Roman Catholic Diocese of Nantes established.
 445 CE - Nantes besieged by Huns.
 453 - Desiderius becomes .
 548 -  becomes Catholic bishop.
 843-936 - The Normans held the town.
 992 - Nantes taken by forces of the Duke of Brittany.
 1118 - Fire.
 1207 - Château des ducs de Bretagne constructed, a large castle in Nantes.
 1434 - Nantes Cathedral construction begins.
 1460 - University of Nantes founded.
 1468 - Château des ducs de Bretagne rebuilt.
 1493 - Printing press in operation.
 1560 - Francis II of France grants Nantes a communal constitution.
 1598 - Edict of Nantes, granting rights to Protestants, signed in the Château des ducs de Bretagne.
 1626 - Henry de Talleyrand punished for plotting against Cardinal Richelieu.
 1640 - Nantes Stock Exchange established.
 1685 - Revocation of Edict of Nantes by Louis XIV.
 1720 - Street signs introduced.(fr)
 1753 -  (library) opens.
 1788 - Théâtre Graslin inaugurated.
 1790 - Nantes becomes part of the Loire-Inférieure souveraineté.
 1793 - 29 June: Battle of Nantes.
 1800 - Population: 77,162.

19th century

 1803 - Chamber of Commerce established.
 1806 - Municipal botanical garden established.
 1808 - Lycée of Nantes inaugurated.
 1815 - Palais de la Bourse (Nantes) built.
 1817 - Slave trade officially banned.
 1827 -  shopping arcade built.
 1830 - Musée des Beaux-Arts de Nantes opens.
 1832 - Duchess of Berry arrested for trying to stir up La Vendée against Louis Philippe I.
 1843 - Passage Pommeraye shopping arcade built.
 1846
 Lefèvre-Utile biscuit company in business.
 Notre-Dame de Bon-Port church built.
 1848 - Labor unrest; crackdown.
 1851 - Angers-Nantes railway begins operating.
 1852 -  built.
 1856 - Population: 108,530.
 1858 - Nantes-Brest canal opens.
 1869 -  (church) built.
 1875 - Natural History Museum of Nantes opens.
 1876 - Population: 122,247.
 1881 - Societe Nantaise de Photographie founded.
 1891 - Nantes Cathedral construction completed.
 1894 - Musée Dobrée left to the town.
 1895 - La Cigale (brasserie) in business.
 1900 - Ecole Supérieure de Commerce de Nantes established.

20th century

 1903 - July: 1903 Tour de France passes through Nantes.
 1906 - Population: 118,244 town; 133,247 commune.
 1911 - Population: 170,535.
 1937 - Stade Malakoff (stadium) opens.
 1941 -  (bridge) rebuilt.
 1943
 .
 Football Club de Nantes formed.
 1946
 Post-war rebuilding begins.
 Population: 200,265.
 1951 - Nantes Atlantique Airport begins commercial flights.
 1955 - Unité d'Habitation of Nantes-Rezé (apartment building) constructed.
 1965 - André Morice becomes mayor.
 1966 -  (bridge) built.
 1968 - Gare de Nantes (rail station) opens.
 1971 - Orchestre National des Pays de la Loire established.
 1973 - Palais des Sports de Beaulieu (arena) built.
 1975 -  (bridge) built.
 1976 - Tour Bretagne built.
 1977
 Socialist  becomes mayor.
 Socialist Party national congress held in Nantes.
 1978 - Jules Verne Museum founded.
 1979
  (bridge) built.
 Three Continents Festival of film begins.
 1980
 Planetarium of Nantes established.
 Sister city relationship established with Seattle, USA.
 1982 - Nantes becomes part of the Pays de la Loire region.
 1983 -  becomes mayor.
 1984 - Stade de la Beaujoire (stadium) opens.
 1985 - Nantes tramway begins operating.
 1988 - École de design Nantes Atlantique and  established.
 1989
 Royal de Luxe marionette street theatre active.
 Jean-Marc Ayrault becomes mayor.
 1990 - École des mines de Nantes established.
 1991
 École centrale de Nantes active.
 Les Anneaux de la Mémoire nonprofit headquartered in Nantes.
 1992 -  opens.
 1995 - La Folle Journée music festival begins.
 1998 -  established.
 1999 - Population: 270,251.
 2000 - Utopiales science fiction festival begins.

21st century

 2001
 Nantes.fr municipal website in operation.
 Soy Festival of music begins.
 2005 - Navibus (water bus) begins operating.
 2006 - Nantes Busway begins operating.
 2007
 Machines of the Isle of Nantes exhibit opens.
 Estuaire (biennale) art exhibit begins in Nantes vicinity.
 2009 - Nantes Derby Girls (rollerderby league) formed.
 2011 - Population: 287,845.
 2014
 March:  held.
 Johanna Rolland becomes mayor.
 22 December: 2014 Nantes attack.
 2015 - December:  held.
 2018- July 03- Police Officer shoots and kills 22 year old Aboubakar Fofana after he reverses his car towards another officer and 2 kids forcing one officer to shoot him in which the bullet hit him in the neck and hit an artery. The car was suspected of being used in drug dealing and Fofana had given police a false name prior to the shooting occurring. Following the shooting wide spread riots and protest occurred in the streets of Nantes.

See also
 Nantes history
 
 List of mayors of Nantes
 
  department
  region.

other cities in the Pays de la Loire region
 Timeline of Angers
 Timeline of Le Mans

References

This article incorporates information from the French Wikipedia.

Bibliography

in English

in French
 
  circa 1856

External links

 Items related to Nantes, various dates (via Europeana).
 Items related to Nantes, various dates (via Digital Public Library of America).

Nantes
nantes
nantes